Julie E. Ledgerwood is an American allergist and immunologist, who is the chief medical officer and serves as chief of the Clinical Trials Program at the Vaccine Research Center (VRC) of the National Institute of Allergy and Infectious Diseases (NIAID), part of the National Institutes of Health in Bethesda, Maryland. She is a Doctor of Osteopathic Medicine.

Ledgerwood leads clinical trials and clinical collaborations for the VRC; and has served as principal investigator, protocol chair, or associate investigator for over 60 Phase 1-2b clinical trials studying vaccines and monoclonal antibodies targeting pathogens such as HIV, influenza, Ebola, malaria, Chikungunya, and Zika in over 13 countries. She led the first human trial aimed at testing a vaccine for Ebola virus and the first evaluation of mAb114, a monoclonal antibody targeting Ebola.

For the past 15 years, she has conducted research with numerous academic research teams and has led international vaccine research collaborations. Ledgerwood has authored textbook chapters and over 85 publications in peer-reviewed journals.

Education
Ledgerwood graduated from Phillips University in Enid, Oklahoma and received her Doctor of Osteopathic Medicine degree from the College of Osteopathic Medicine at Oklahoma State University Center for Health Sciences.

Career
From 1999 to 2002, Ledgerwood completed her medical residency in internal medicine at Johns Hopkins Bayview Medical Center in Baltimore, Maryland. In 2002, Ledgerwood joined NIAID as a clinical fellow in allergy and immunology. In 2003, she joined the VRC as a clinical investigator. Ledgerwood is board certified by the American Board of Allergy and Immunology.

Her work has been covered extensively in lay and scientific media outlets, including NBC News, Politico, The Guardian, NPR, and The New York Times.

References

External links

NIH
Official laboratory page:http://www.niaid.nih.gov/labsandresources/labs/aboutlabs/vrc/clinicaltrialscorelaboratory/Pages/default.aspx

News Coverage

Ebola
NBC News coverage, first human trial for Ebola: http://www.nbcnews.com/storyline/ebola-virus-outbreak/first-human-ebola-vaccine-trial-shows-it-seems-work-n256196 
Interview, “Q&A: Tales from the front lines of vaccine research at the NIH,” from, The DO: http://thedo.osteopathic.org/2013/07/qa-tales-from-the-front-lines-of-vaccine-research-at-the-nih/ 
“How to Eradicate Political Panic,” from Politico, http://www.politico.com/magazine/story/2015/09/ebola-health-panic-213094 
Nigeria: Trial Confirms Ebola Vaccine Candidate Safe,” The Guardian, http://allafrica.com/stories/201501080823.html 
“Trial sheds light on lower VSV-EBOV doses,” University of Minnesota Center for Infectious Disease Research and Policy (CIDRAP), http://www.cidrap.umn.edu/news-perspective/2015/08/news-scan-aug-04-2015
“Ebola Vaccine Prompts Immune Response,” NIH news release (official), http://www.nih.gov/news-events/nih-research-matters/ebola-vaccine-prompts-immune-response 
“Ebola Update: Plasma-based therapy trials begin in West Africa; NIH-GSK vaccine shows promise in Phase 1; the real statistics,” The Scientist, http://www.the-scientist.com/?articles.view/articleNo/41692/title/Ebola-Update/

Chikungunya 
“Chikungunya is on the move,” Science News, (Society for Science & the Public), https://www.sciencenews.org/article/chikungunya-move 
“Experimental Vaccine For Chikungunya Passes First Test,” NPR, https://www.npr.org/sections/goatsandsoda/2014/08/18/341360645/experimental-vaccine-for-chikungunya-passes-first-test 
“Could a new vaccine offer protection against chikungunya virus,” Medical News 
Today, http://www.medicalnewstoday.com/articles/281062.php

Marburg Virus
“Very Sick, and Now a Curiosity,” [Marburg coverage], The New York Times, https://www.nytimes.com/2009/12/22/health/22virus.html?_r=1

VRC
Vaccine Research Center

American osteopathic physicians
21st-century American women physicians
21st-century American physicians
American immunologists
Oklahoma State University alumni
Phillips University alumni
American virologists
Year of birth missing (living people)
Living people
National Institutes of Health people
21st-century American women scientists